"Don't You Dare" is a song by British singer/songwriter and record producer Taio Cruz. The song appeared online on 21 June 2014. An official cover art similar to that of his single "Do What You Like" surfaced online as well. The song was originally meant for his never released studio album #Black, as well as impacting radio on 12 May. However, neither the song or album were ever officially released.

Track listing

Release history

References

2014 songs
Taio Cruz songs